The Beboid languages are any of several groups of languages spoken principally in southwest Cameroon, although two languages (Bukwen and Mashi) are spoken over the border in Nigeria. They are probably not most closely related to each other. The Eastern Beboid languages may be most closely related to the Tivoid and Momo groups, though some of the geographical Western Beboid grouping may be closer to Ekoid and Bantu.

Previous research includes a study of noun classes in Beboid languages by Jean-Marie Hombert (1980), Larry Hyman (1980, 1981), a dissertation by Richards (1991) concerning the phonology of three eastern Beboid languages (Noni, Ncane and Nsari), Lux (2003) a Noni lexicon and Cox (2005) a phonology of Kemezung.

Languages
SIL International survey reports have provided more detail on Eastern and Western Beboid (Brye & Brye 2002, 2004; Hamm et al. 2002) and Hamm (2002) is a brief overview of the group as a whole.

Eastern Beboid is clearly valid; speakers recognise the relationship between their languages, their distribution is the result of recent population movements and linguistically they are similar, and they are close to the Bantu languages. The term "Beboid" sometimes refers specifically to this group. Western Beboid, on the other hand, is a geographic rather than genetic group: some appear to be closer to the Grassfields languages, and there does not appear to be much to link them together, though this may be partly due to lack of data (Good 2009, Di Carlo & Good 2012). They are also called "Yemne-Kimbi" when the eastern group is called just "Beboid" (Di Carlo & Good 2012).

Eastern Beboid (Beboid) Cung, Bebe–Kemezung, Naki, Saari–Noni (Ncane-Mungong-Noone), Fio, Mbuk

Western Beboid (Yemne-Kimbi) — geographic
Fang
Koshin
Mundabli and Buu
Mungbam and Missong
Mbu’ (Ajumbu) and Lung

Also spoken in the area is Bikya (Furu), one of the Furu languages, and Kung, one of the Ring languages.

Names and locations (Nigeria)
Below is a list of language names, populations, and locations (in Nigeria only) from Blench (2019).

See also
Beboid word lists (Wiktionary)

Bibliography 
 Blench, Roger, 2011. 'The membership and internal structure of Bantoid and the border with Bantu'. Bantu IV, Humboldt University, Berlin.
Blench, Roger. n.d. Beboid word lists.
Brye, Edward and Elizabeth Brye. 2002. "Rapid appraisal and intelligibility testing surveys of the Eastern Beboid group of languages (Northwest Province)." SIL Electronic Survey Reports 2002-019. http://www.sil.org/silesr/2002/019/
Pierpaolo Di Carlo & Jeff Good. 2012. What are we trying to preserve?: Diversity, change, and ideology at the edge of the Cameroonian Grassfields
Good, Jeff, & Jesse Lovegren. 2009. 'Reassessing Western Beboid'. Bantu III.
Good, Jeff, & Scott Farrar. 2008. 'Western Beboid and African language classification'. LSA.
Hamm, Cameron,  Diller, J., Jordan-Diller, K. & F. Assako a Tiati. 2002. A rapid appraisal survey of Western Beboid languages (Menchum Division, Northwest Province). SIL Electronic Survey Reports 2002-014. http://www.sil.org/silesr/2002/014/
Hamm, C. 2002. Beboid Language Family of Cameroon and Nigeria: Location and Genetic Classification. SIL Electronic Survey Reports 2002
Hombert, Jean-Marie. 1980. Noun Classes of the Beboid Languages. In Noun classes in the Grassfields Bantu borderland, SCOPIL 8. Los Angeles: University of Southern California.

References 

 
Languages of Cameroon
Languages of Nigeria